Mike 'Spike' Edwards (born February 1962) based in Nidderdale, is an English motorcycle road racer.
He is a seven time motorcycle champion in various classes.

Mike 'Spike' Edwards after competing in motorcycle racing each year since 1982, is now offering access to his extensive race and on track experience, through his online presence producing  motorcycle related info vids, circuit guides, and hint and tips on riding techniques.

Edwards has a broad range of online profiles, usually through his brand identity of 'no1bloke'

Edwards is now also using Patreon as a platform to provide exclusive online content to his subscribers; where there are several tiers of contributions for which the subscribers can earn a variety of rewards. 

Edwards drawing on his extensive motorcycle racing experience has prepared track guides, on how he rides a decent lap of the race circuit. Using his own personally recorded onboard action video Edwards edits the track in to sections, and uses slow motion and freeze frames to highlight and illustrate markers and reference points with a voiceover; as a rider aid, whether you are a racer or track day rider this guide may be able to offer you some pointers to put together a good lap. You can browse his extensive library of "how I ride" circuit guides to stream or instantly download on Vimeo. 

With a particular love and enjoyment for Endurance Racing, Edwards with different teams, private and factory supported, has secured 5 World Endurance rostrums. Brno, Silverstone, Paul Ricard, Imola and Vallelunga.

He enjoys competing worldwide and is renowned for his ability to ride a wide range of motorcycles racing in endurance racing, Classic racing and Supermono events.
Additionally Edwards is one of a few ACU certified Commercial Road Race Coaches.
Edwards has previously trained as a Driving Standards Agency, Compulsory Basic Training and Direct Access Training instructor.

Edwards now offers an on track and online coaching and riding assessment scheme, V121Pro where he uses video footage to help other motorcyclists improve their riding skills.

Edwards had great fund racing his eBay project 'Gordon' where he took a £454 Yamaha SZR 660cc salvage yard wreck to rostrum finishes in the British Supermono Championship. Through the creation of 'Gordon's Special Friends' the bike was totally rebuilt and race prepared; with the progress documented on a popular website and blog. Mike also completed another motorcycle restoration race project named 'Nancy' a Yamaha FZ600 with the rebuild and restoration project being followed as editorial pieces in Classic Motorcycle Mechanics magazine.

Career highlights
1988 British JuniorStock Champion
1992 400cc British Supersport Championship
1995 600cc British Supersport Championship
2004 British Supermono Champion (watercooled)
2014 British Historic GP Champion
2015 British Historic GP Champion
2017 Euro FIM International Classic GP Champion

Edwards is an established motorcycle racing journeyman - a respected competitor with extensive and successful race experience, having competed every single year since 1982.
With 7 separate Championship titles, in depth experience, winning on the Roads, and at World and European level - his history in the sport runs deep.

On the 'pure' roadsEdwards won:
The Macau Grand Prix on a works Yamaha engine ROC 500
North West 200 Supersport 600cc race
 
He's had some great fun in World Endurance, with many rostrums with different bike manufacturers, racing all over the world, including the iconic Suzuka 8hr; Edwards' favourite result being 2nd at the Bol d'Or with teammates Robert Holden and Steve Manley to the factory Yamaha team with the Sarron brothers and Yasu Nagai in 1984.
He's the last Briton to have won the Imola 200 since Paul Smart in 1972

Supermono bikes and the racing class has long held an attraction for Edwards, who enjoys the camaraderie and engineering skills that this class particularly offers. Having ridden the factory backed MuZ Skorpion single to many race wins, Edwards also enjoyed great success racing a ‘mini mono’ – 450cc engine in a 125 size frame in the European Supermono series. His notorious project ‘Gordon’ www.gordonsalive.com was born from Edwards' love of supermonos.

Wanting to pass on the wealth of knowledge Edwards has been lucky enough to acquire over the years; he is now also a road race coach.
It's not been easy to achieve; but by giving something back to the sport that has given him so much over the years, he definitely thinks it's worth it.
Edwards has been the only independent ACU certified commercial road racing coach since 2006; in addition to his motorcycle 'on track' coaching,  Mike now offers the facility for distance or online coaching, either using the client's own video or through a two way, online virtual track walk.
With the online coaching, the customer keeps a copy of the coaching video to rewatch and revise from.  

Edwards enjoys a good online presence across many motorcycling message boards  and has a good following of his racing related videos on his YouTube channel, or you can simply search for him online to see them.

Sources

External links
 Mike Edwards web site
 Coaching website
 "how I ride" track guide list

1962 births
Living people
Sportspeople from Harrogate
British motorcycle racers
English motorcycle racers